Oldham R.L.F.C., also known as the Roughyeds, is a professional rugby league football club in Oldham, Greater Manchester, England. The club currently competes in the RFL League 1, the third tier of British Rugby League.

Formed in 1876 as Oldham Football Club, Oldham are one of the original twenty-two rugby clubs that formed the Northern Rugby Football Union in 1895.

The club became known as Oldham Bears from the 1996 season until financial difficulties led to liquidation in 1997. A new club formed as Oldham R.L.F.C. in time for the 1998 season, maintaining the former club's traditional nickname of the Roughyeds. Roughyed is a nickname for a person from Oldham, derived from the rough felt used in the hatting industry which once employed many people.

Oldham played from 1889 to 1997 at Watersheddings in the north east of the town. Oldham's home ground is now Whitebank Stadium in Limeside. However, as Whitebank does not meet the standards for the Championship Division, Oldham have instead used  Bower Fold in Stalybridge during those campaigns between 2017 and 2021. The club have also previously used Boundary Park, Hurst Cross and Park Lane, Whitefield prior to Whitebank Stadium. Oldham returned to Bower Fold for the 2020 season.

Relegation to League 1 at the conclusion of the 2017 and 2021 Championship seasons saw the club return to Whitebank Stadium.  

Oldham have won the Championship four times and the Challenge Cup three times.

The team's traditional strip consists of red and white hooped jerseys, navy blue shorts and red socks.

Traditional local rivals include Rochdale Hornets, Huddersfield Giants, Halifax, Salford Red Devils and Swinton Lions.

History

Early years

In 1876, Oldham Football Club was founded in a meeting at the Prince Albert Hotel, Union Street West, attended by Chairman of the Watch Committee, William Chadwick, Chief Constable Charles Hodgkinson, mill owner Fred Wild, eminent local Quaker and Lord to be Alfred Emmott and three brothers of the Fletcher family.

A playing field was organised at Sugar Meadow, Gartside Street adjacent to Glodwick Spinning Mill and changing facilities were provided by the nearby Shakespeare Inn. The club's headquarters were at the Black Swan Hotel, Bottom O'th Moor, Mumps. Their first match at Sugar Meadow was held on 21 October 1876 against Stalybridge. After two seasons they joined Oldham Cricket Club at the new Clarksfield ground before finding a more permanent home in 1889 at Watersheddings.

Oldham were one of the twenty-one clubs that left the Rugby Football Union to form the Northern Union in 1895. Oldham were fourth in the first title race of 1895–96 and second a year later. They were the second club to win the Challenge Cup after beating Hunslet 19–9 in 1899. Batley had won the first two finals.

Oldham finally won their first Championship title in 1904–05, just edging out Bradford Northern by three points. Oldham won the Lancashire League in 1897–98, 1900–01 and 1907–08 as well as the Lancashire County Cup in 1906–07. In the 1907–08 season, Oldham finished as league leaders but Hunslet were crowned champions in their historic all-four cups season after winning the Championship Final 12–2 in a replay after an initial 7–7 draw.

Another title success followed in 1909–10 as they beat Wigan in the Championship final. Also in that same season they managed to win the Lancashire League and Lancashire Cup. The following season, 1910–11, they beat Wigan again in the Championship final.

Oldham's record attendance was set in 1912 when the visit of Huddersfield for a league match drew 28,000 spectators.

Oldham won the Lancashire League in 1921–22 and the Lancashire Cup in 1912–13, 1918–19 and 1923–24. The annual Law Cup was first contested against neighbours Rochdale Hornets on 7 May 1921. Having lost in the 1907, 1912 and 1924 Challenge Cup Finals, they finally won the trophy again in 1925 when they beat Hull Kingston Rovers 16–3 at Headingley, Leeds.

They beat the visiting Australasian team of the 1921–22 Kangaroo tour of Great Britain 15–5.

The club's last Challenge Cup final was in 1927 when they beat Swinton 26–7 at Central Park, Wigan, their fourth consecutive final and revenge for their 9–3 defeat when the same teams met in the previous year's match. In 1932–33, Oldham won the Lancashire Cup again.

Post-war

In the 1950s, Oldham won the Championship and other trophies with a side that included Alan Davies, John Etty, goalkicker Bernard Ganley, Jack Keith, Sid Little, Frank Pitchford, Derek 'Rocky' Turner, Don Vines and Charlie Winslade.

On Monday 15 September 1952, record receipts were taken from a gate of 19,370 at Watersheddings to watch Oldham take on the Kangaroo tourists. The Australians lost only one of twenty-two club matches in Britain during that tour, but came close to defeat at Oldham, where the Roughyeds held them to a 7–7 draw.

Oldham played in the 1954–55 Championship Final at Maine Road, Manchester against Warrington. They also lost the Lancashire Cup final in a 2–12 defeat by Barrow in 1954.

Oldham's success in the 1950s also included a Championship title – in 1956–57; the Lancashire League 1956–57 and 1957–58 and the Lancashire Cup 1955–56, 1956–57 and 1957–58. Oldham lost 16–13 to Wigan in the 1966 Lancashire Cup Final. In 1964, Oldham reached the semi-finals of the Challenge Cup against Hull Kingston Rovers, the tie is remembered for taking three games to find the winner, the first match at Headingley finished 5–5, the replay at Station Road, Swinton finished prematurely 17–14 in Oldham's favour when the game was abandoned midway through the second half due to bad light, and the third game was won by Hull Kingston Rovers 12–2 at Fartown, Huddersfield.
 
Oldham were Division Two champions in 1963–64.

At the end of a disastrous 1969–70 season, when Oldham finished 29th out of 30 clubs in a single division, the committee was voted out of office en bloc and replaced by nine new officials and a new chairman in Arthur Walker. They brought in Graham Starkey as player-coach.

Dave Cox coached Oldham for 18 months until December 1978.

In the 1983–84 season, Oldham lost just two of their opening 11 Division One fixtures but collapsed around Christmas. After four defeats in five games, January's home game against Leigh descended into a mass brawl before the referee abandoned the match. Both clubs were fined £1,000 and coach Peter Smethurst decided to quit. The club committee asked his assistant, Frank Barrow to step into the breach. His first game was against rock-bottom Whitehaven, winless after 22 matches. But the Cumbrians ran in seven tries, handing Oldham a 42–8 mauling, and prompting Barrow to resign minutes after the game. He was replaced on a temporary basis by Brian Gartland.

Oldham pleaded with the local council for a financial bail-out in April 1987. Oldham decided to float as a public limited company and sold their training ground to the council in May 1987. Oldham won the 1988 Division Two title and the Division Two Premiership but lost £135,000. They would win the Premiership again in 1989–90.

Peter Tunks took over a coaching role with Oldham. Tunk's brief was clear: He had to sell most of his first team squad that had been relegated twice in 3 years, help to pay a tax bill of over 1 million pounds and sign promising players from the junior ranks. He narrowly missed promotion in the first year and took the team to the grand final where they were narrowly beaten. Over the next 2 years he got promotion to the top level for all the Oldham teams whilst getting young players like Chris Joynt, Barrie McDermott, David Bradbury, Gary Christie and Tommy Martyn to international level but due to the clubs massive debts run up by the previous management, Tunks was forced to sell his best players. Bob Lindner took over as captain-coach. The club sold the dilapidated Watersheddings in June 1994 for £1.25m to pay-off debts and moved to Oldham Athletic's Boundary Park stadium on the nearby Chadderton/Royton boundary.

When a Rupert Murdoch funded Super League competition was proposed, part of the deal was that some traditional clubs would merge. Oldham were supposed to merge with Salford to form a club to be known as Manchester which would compete in the Super League. When Salford visited Oldham for a match on Good Friday, 14 April, supporters of both clubs demonstrated against the unpopular idea by invading the pitch during the interval. This merger was resisted and instead they adopted the name Oldham Bears and were founder members of the new league.

Relegation came in the second year of the new summer season, 1997, when they finished below Paris Saint-Germain. Later that year, under chairman Jim Quinn, they went bankrupt with debts of £2,000,000. A new team Oldham Roughyeds was then formed in December to play at a lower level. The new club was created by Chris Hamilton and a band of three directors.  The Roughyeds tag had been a long accepted nickname for the old club. It is however generally accepted that the new club (Oldham Roughyeds) is a legal continuation of the old club formed in 1876.

The Millennium

Mike Ford retired as player-coach of Oldham in 2001 and in January the following year took up a post as defensive co-ordinator with the Irish Rugby Football Union. Oldham put Mark Knight in temporary charge of the first team. After a successful 2001 season, they narrowly missed out on promotion to the Super League, losing to Widnes 12–24 in the Northern Ford Premiership Grand Final.

During the 2002 season they played at Ashton United's Hurst Cross ground in Ashton-under-Lyne, due to a dispute with Oldham Athletic over the use of Boundary Park.

Steve Molloy took charge of the Roughyeds after former boss John Harbin left to join Oldham Athletic as fitness conditioner and sports psychologist in July 2002. Under Molloy, Oldham won seven and drew two of their last 14 games. In doing so Oldham finished high enough to gain entry into National League One when the Northern Ford Premiership was split into two. In the first season of National League One, 2003, Oldham reached the last four of the play-offs. Although they still made the play-offs for the next couple of seasons trouble was waiting in the wings. Those troubles surfaced in March 2005, Oldham entered a creditors' voluntary agreement (CVA) with total debts of £325,000.

John Pendlebury resigned after three games as coach in March 2006 and was replaced by Steve Deakin, with very little money to spend and a poor squad the team finished the 2006 season with only one league win and were relegated to National League Two, the season ended on a high note though because the club paid its final payment of the CVA and would start the next season debt free. The Roughyeds also announced that they would stay at Boundary Park for the 2007 season after reaching agreement on a sliding scale rent.

2007 – new ownership

In 2007, a few games into the new season, the excavation and demolition firm, the William Quinn Group, acquired a 52% stake in the club. That stake was later increased to 75%. Bill Quinn became the club's new chairman, with previous owners Chris Hamilton and Sean Whitehead remaining as directors.

On Friday 4 May 2007, Oldham took part in the first ever National League Two match broadcast live on British television, on Sky Sports. They won 34–26 away to the Crusaders in Bridgend, having trailed by 20 points after 45 minutes. The match was considered a warm-up for the Millennium Magic weekend in Cardiff the following day and, due to fans of Super League teams attending, attracted National League Two's highest ever attendance of 3,441.

That National League Two attendance record was broken in the return fixture on Thursday, 30 August 2007 between Oldham and Crusaders, again in front of the Sky Sports cameras, when 4,327 fans turned up at Boundary Park beating the old record by 886. it was also Oldham's largest attendance since the early 1990s. The event also raised around £8,000 for local charities and the rugby league players' benevolent fund.

Oldham finished their most successful season in recent years in 4th place on the National League Two table, they then played and won games against Swinton at home then Barrow away in the play-off to reach the National League Two Grand Final, but the game seemed a step too far for Oldham going down to an inspired Featherstone Rovers team at Headingley.

2008 season summary

Northern Rail Cup – Oldham enjoyed reasonable success in the Northern Rail Cup, achieving a win over National League One favourites, Salford at Boundary Park to enable them to make it through the group stage of the competition into the knockout stages where they faced and beat another National League One team in Whitehaven to progress to the quarter finals against Batley at Mount Pleasant, in a see-saw battle Oldham's challenge died thanks to a dubious referee call followed up by a quick fire Batley try.

Challenge Cup –  Oldham were the last non-Super League club to be knocked out of the 2008 Challenge Cup, going as far as the quarter finals before being beaten by Wakefield Trinity at Belle Vue.

National League Two – Despite winning more games and losing less games than Barrow but only winning 1 bonus point (to Barrow's 5 points) all season Oldham finished 3rd in National League Two on points difference behind Barrow who came 2nd and Gateshead who won the league, Oldham would again have to face the route of the play-offs and like the previous year Oldham again reached the National League Two Grand Final, this time against Doncaster and like 2007 Oldham again lost to miss out on promotion to National League One losing 18–10 at Warrington's Halliwell Jones Stadium, as a result of not gaining promotion to National League One coach Steve Deakin did not have his contract renewed.

2009 season summary

Tony Benson became head coach of Oldham.

2009 Championship 1 – Oldham finished fourth in the 2009 Co-operative Championship One table with a record of 10–1–7. The Roughyeds won 31–26 at home to Swinton in the first round of the play-offs before winning 54–30 at home to Hunslet Hawks. That set up a final eliminator against York City Knights, who finished third in the table, and the Roughyeds upset the hosts by winning 44–14 to reach the Grand Final again. But Oldham were beaten in the Grand Final for a third straight year, losing 28–26 to Keighley, who finished second in the table.

Roughyeds were told they would no longer be able to use Oldham Athletic's Boundary Park in November 2009. The club went to Oldham Council for help. Oldham Council bought Whitebank Stadium from Oldham Boro F.C. and then entered into a lease agreement with Oldham Roughyeds RLFC.

The 2010 season saw a transition with the five home games were played out of town at Sedgley Park R.U.F.C.'s Park Lane ground in Whitefield. Roughyeds' first game at Whitebank took place on 9 May 2010 with the opposition being York. This was the first time that Oldham had played in a ground within Oldham borough since 1997. Home crowds are nearly double at Whitebank compared to Park Lane.

2010s
Oldham suffered relegation to League 1 at the end of the 2017 Championship season.
In 2019, they earned promotion back to the Championship after defeating Newcastle in the League 1 play off final.

2020s
In the 2021 Championship season, Oldham finished second bottom on the table and were relegated back to League 1 having just won two matches all season.

Past coaches
Also see :Category:Oldham R.L.F.C. coaches.

 Harry Varley 1897-1899
 Graham Starkey
 Peter Smethurst
 Gerry Helme
 Frank Barrow
 Dave Cox 1977-1978
 Frank Myler 1980–87
 Eric Fitzsimons 1988
 Tony Barrow 1988–90
 John Fieldhouse 1991
 Peter Tunks 1993
 Bob Lindner 1994
 Andy Goodway 1994–97
 Matt Munro 1997
 Mike Ford 1997–2001
 John Harbin 2002
 Steve Molloy 2004
 Steve Deakin 2007–08
 Tony Benson 2008–12
 Scott Naylor 2013–2019
 Matt Diskin 2019–2021
 Brendan Sheridan (interim) 2021
 Stuart Littler 2021-present

2022 squad

2021 transfers

Gains

Losses

Players

Seasons

Super League era

Honours

Rugby Football League Championship champions: 4
1904–05, 1909–10, 1910–11, 1956–57
Rugby Football League Championship runners up: 5
1906-07, 1907–08, 1908–09, 1921–22, 1954–55
Challenge Cup winners: 3
1898–99, 1924–25, 1926–27
Challenge Cup runners up: 4
1906-07, 1911–12, 1923–24, 1925-26
Lancashire League champions: 7
1897–98, 1900–01, 1907–08, 1909–10, 1921–22, 1956–57, 1957–58
Lancashire League runners up: 9
1895-96, 1896–97, 1898–99, 1899–1900, 1908–09, 1910–11, 1911–12, 1923–24, 1954–55
Lancashire County Cup winners: 9
1907–08, 1910–11, 1913–14, 1919–20, 1924–25, 1933–34, 1956–57, 1957–58, 1958–59
Lancashire County Cup runners up: 9
1908-09, 1911–12, 1918–19, 1922–23, 1954–55, 1966–67, 1968–69, 1986–87, 1989–90

Records

Attendance for a league match: 28,000 vs. Huddersfield Giants – 24 February 1912 at Watersheddings, Oldham
Attendance in a cup match: 25,000 vs. Huddersfield Giants – 23 March 1912, Challenge Cup 3rd Round at Watersheddings, Oldham
Record attendance (all games) : 62,217 vs. Hull F.C. – 18 May 1957. Championship Final at Odsal Stadium, Bradford
Super League attendance record : 7,709 vs. Wigan Warriors – 30 March 1996 at Boundary Park, Oldham
National League Two attendance record : 4,327 vs. Celtic Crusaders – 30 August 2007 at Boundary Park, Oldham
International tour match attendance record : 19,620 vs. Australia – 15 September 1952 at Watersheddings, Oldham
Record victory: 102–6 vs. West Wales Raiders - 8 July 2018
Record defeat: 0–84 vs. Widnes Vikings – 25 July 1999
Most all-time appearances: Joe Ferguson - 627 from September 1899 - April 1923
Most consecutive appearances: Joe Lawton - 134 from September 1897 - November 1902
Most goals in a season: Bernard Ganley – 224 goals in season 1957–58
Most tries in a season: Reginald "Reg" Farrar – 49 tries in season 1921–22
Most all-time tries: Alan Davies - 174 from 1950 to 1961
Most points in a match: Bernard Ganley – 28 points vs. Liverpool City, April 1959
Most points in a season: Bernard Ganley - 412 points in season 1957-58
Most drop goals in a season: Ray Ashton - 9 in season 1979-80

The Law Cup

The Law Cup is an annual pre-season friendly match between Oldham and Rochdale Hornets, first contested in 1921 as the Infirmaries Cup and later renamed after the Rochdale MP Alfred Law who had originally donated the trophy.  Oldham have won 45 to Rochdale Hornets' 20 with 2 drawn games.

Notes

References

External links
 Official site
 Rugby Oldham Community Trust
 Oldham Rugby League Heritage Trust
 Oldham Roughyeds forum on rlfans.com
 Official Rugby League Website

 
Sport in Oldham
Super League teams
1876 establishments in England
Rugby clubs established in 1876
Founder members of the Northern Rugby Football Union
Rugby league teams in Greater Manchester
English rugby league teams